Stenacris is a genus of spur-throat toothpick grasshoppers in the family Acrididae. There are about six described species in Stenacris.

Species
These six species belong to the genus Stenacris:
 Stenacris caribea (Rehn & Hebard, 1938)
 Stenacris fissicauda (Bruner, 1908)
 Stenacris megacephala Bruner, 1920
 Stenacris minor (Bruner, 1906)
 Stenacris vitreipennis (Marschall, 1836) (glassy-winged toothpick grasshopper)
 Stenacris xanthochlora (Marschall, 1836)

References

Further reading

 

Acrididae
Articles created by Qbugbot